Volker Tönsfeldt (born 24 November 1952) is a German former professional footballer who played as a forward.

Career
Tönsfeldt played for Holstein Kiel between 1978 and 1980. In 1980, he joined Djurgårdens IF. Tönsfeldt made 22 Allsvenskan matches for Djurgårdens IF.

References

External links
 

1952 births
Living people
German footballers
Association football forwards
2. Bundesliga players
Allsvenskan players
Holstein Kiel players
Djurgårdens IF Fotboll players
German expatriate footballers
German expatriate sportspeople in Sweden
Expatriate footballers in Sweden